Élodie Godin (born 5 July 1985, in Cherbourg) is a French basketball center currently playing for Famila Basket Schio in Italy's Serie A and the Euroleague. She was a member of the French national team, winning the 2009 Eurobasket and a silver medal at the 2012 Summer Olympics and playing the 2006 and 2010 World Championships.

Club career
  Bourges (2003–06), Valenciennes Olympic (2006–07)
  USK Prague (2007–08)
  Cras Taranto (2008-2012)
  Famila Basket Schio (2012-)

References

External links 
 
 
 

1985 births
Living people
Basketball players at the 2012 Summer Olympics
French expatriate basketball people in Italy
French women's basketball players
Medalists at the 2012 Summer Olympics
Knights of the Ordre national du Mérite
Olympic basketball players of France
Olympic medalists in basketball
Olympic silver medalists for France
Centers (basketball)